Bleptina araealis is a species of moth in the family Erebidae. It was described by George Hampson in 1901. It occurs in Florida and the Antilles.

References 

Erebidae
Moths described in 1901